The 1989 Atlantic 10 Conference Baseball Championship was held at Bear Stadium in Boyertown, Pennsylvania from May 12 through 14. The double elimination tournament featured the top two regular-season finishers from both of the league's divisions. West top seed George Washington defeated Temple in the title game to win the tournament for the second time, earning the Atlantic 10's automatic bid to the 1989 NCAA Tournament.

Seeding and format 
Each division's top teams, based on winning percentage in the 16-game regular season schedule, qualified for the field. In the opening round of the four-team double-elimination format, the East Division champion played the West Division runner-up, and vice versa.

Bracket

All-Tournament 
Temple's Mike Palys and George Washington's Frank Terry shared Most Valuable Player honors. George Washington's Mike Rolfes was named Most Valuable Pitcher.

References 

Atlantic 10 Conference tournament
Atlantic 10 Conference Baseball Tournament
Atlantic 10 Conference baseball tournament
Atlantic 10 Conference baseball tournament
Baseball in Pennsylvania
College sports in Pennsylvania
History of Berks County, Pennsylvania
Sports competitions in Pennsylvania
Sports in the Delaware Valley
Tourist attractions in Berks County, Pennsylvania